The Stathatos building (Megaron Stathatou) is a neoclassical villa on the Vasilissis Sofias Avenue. It was built in 1895 by the Saxon-Greek architect Ernst Ziller for the Stathatos Family.

History
The house was donated by the Stathatos family to the Greek state. It was restored and used for several events. The committee for bringing the Olympic Games to Greece, Athens 1996 had its headquarters here. Today it is part of the Goulandris Museum of Cycladic Art.

Architecture
The building is composed of two wings, nearly symmetrical, connected by an impressive entrance and a cylindrical atrium. On the whole, the building has many neoclassical characteristics: symmetry, geometrical order, use of ancient Greek and Roman orders, elegant shapes.

The entrance is one of the basic parts of the building, unifying the two wings and giving a character to the building. The plan is composed of a rectangle and two semicircles on the long sides of the rectangle. Four columns of the Tuscan order and four composite ones support the roofing, composed of eight vaults. Two columns of the Corinthian order give emphasis to the stairs that lead to the covered part of the entrance.

References

Houses completed in 1895
Houses in Greece
Buildings and structures in Athens
Museums in Athens
Neoclassical architecture in Greece